Trox antiquus is an extinct species of hide beetle in the subfamily Troginae.

References

antiquus
Beetles described in 1909